The Metalurh Donetsk 2012-13 season is Metalurh's 16th Ukrainian Premier League season, and their first season under manager Yuriy Maksymov. During the season Metalurh Donetsk will compete in the Ukrainian Premier League, Europa League and Ukrainian Cup.

Squad

Squad is given according to the club's official website, as of September 1, 2012 , as reported to Ukrainian Premier League.

For recent transfers, see List of Ukrainian football transfers summer 2010 and List of Ukrainian football transfers summer 2009.

Out on loan

Competitions

2012-13 Ukrainian Premier League

Results summary

Results by round

Results

League table

2012-13 Ukrainian Cup Results

UEFA Europa League

Second qualifying round

Third qualifying round

Squad statistics

Goal scorers

Appearances and goals

|-
|colspan="14"|Players who appeared for Metalurh who left the club during the season:
|}

Disciplinary record

References

External links

FC Metalurh Donetsk seasons
Metalurh Donetsk